The Campeonato Internacional de Tênis de Campinas (formerly known as Tetra Pak Tennis Cup) is a tennis tournament held in Campinas, Brazil since 2011. The event is part of the ATP Challenger Tour and is played on outdoor clay courts.

Past finals

Singles

Doubles

References

External links
Official website

 
ATP Challenger Tour
Clay court tennis tournaments
Tetra Pak Tennis Cup
Tennis tournaments in Brazil
Recurring sporting events established in 2011